Algoma may refer to:

Businesses and organisations
 Algoma Central Railway, Northern Ontario
Algoma Central Corporation
Algoma Foundry and Machine Company, Algoma, Wisconsin, U.S.
Algoma Treatment and Remand Centre, a prison in Sault Ste. Marie, Ontario, Canada
 Algoma University, Ontario, Canada
 Essar Steel Algoma, formerly Algoma Steel, a Canadian steel producer

Places

 Algoma District, Ontario, Canada
 Algoma, Mississippi, U.S.
 Algoma, Oregon, U.S.
 Algoma, West Virginia, U.S.
 Algoma, Wisconsin, a city, U.S.
 Algoma, Winnebago County, Wisconsin, a town, U.S.
 Algoma Boulevard Historic District, Oshkosh, Wisconsin, U.S.
 Algoma Township, Michigan, U.S.

Other uses
 , a ship wrecked in 1885 in Lake Superior, U.S. 
 , a 1941 Flower-class corvette

See also
 
 Alcona (disambiguation)
 Algona (disambiguation)

Henry Schoolcraft neologisms